Lectionary 158, designated by siglum ℓ 158 (in the Gregory-Aland numbering) is a Greek manuscript of the New Testament, on paper leaves. Palaeographically it has been assigned to the 16th century.

Description 

The codex contains Lessons from the Acts and Epistles lectionary (Apostolarion),
on 206 paper leaves. The text is written in Greek minuscule letters, in one column per page, 30-32 lines per page. Its readings are close to the codex ℓ 60.

History 

The manuscript once was a part of Colbert's collection. Gregory assigned it by 34a. It was examined by Paulin Martin.

The manuscript is not cited in the critical editions of the Greek New Testament (UBS3).

Currently the codex is located in the Bibliothèque nationale de France (Gr. 383) at Paris.

See also 

 List of New Testament lectionaries
 Biblical manuscript
 Textual criticism

Notes and references 

Greek New Testament lectionaries
16th-century biblical manuscripts